William Weldon may refer to:

 Casey Bill Weldon (William Weldon, 1909–), American country blues musician
 William C. Weldon, chief executive officer of Johnson & Johnson
 William Weldon (officer of arms), officer of arms at the College of Arms in London